Anthony Jacklin CBE (born 7 July 1944) is a retired English golfer. He was the most successful British player of his generation, winning two major championships, the 1969 Open Championship and the 1970 U.S. Open. He was also Ryder Cup captain from 1983 to 1989; Europe winning two and tying another of these four events.

Early life and education
Jacklin was born on 7 July 1944 in the town of Scunthorpe, North Lincolnshire. His father was a steel worker and his mother Dorothy worked at a market. He attended Henderson Avenue Primary School in the town.

Playing career

Jacklin turned professional in 1962, becoming an assistant to Bill Shankland at Potters Bar Golf Club. In 1969, he became the first British player to win The Open Championship in 18 years, winning by two strokes at Royal Lytham & St Annes. The following season, he won his second major title, the U.S. Open by seven strokes on a windblown Hazeltine National Golf Club course. It was the only U.S. Open victory by a European player in an 84-year span (1926–2009); Northern Ireland's Graeme McDowell ended that streak in 2010.

Jacklin won eight events on the European Tour between its first season in 1972 and 1982. He also won tournaments in Europe prior to the European Tour era, and in the United States, South America, South Africa and Australasia. His 1968 PGA Tour win at the Jacksonville Open Invitational was the first by a European player on the U.S. Tour since the 1920s; Jacklin was the first British player since the 1940s and Henry Cotton to devote much of his effort to American Tour events.

However, Jacklin may be best remembered for his involvement in the Ryder Cup. He was a playing member of the "Great Britain and Ireland" team in 1967, 1969, 1971, 1973, 1975 and 1977, and of the first European team in 1979. Except for a tie in 1969, all of those teams were defeated. Jacklin was involved in one of the most memorable moments in Ryder Cup history at Royal Birkdale Golf Club in 1969. After his eagle putt on the 17th evened his match with Jack Nicklaus, Nicklaus conceded Jacklin's two-foot putt on the 18th, halving the match, and ending the Ryder Cup with a tied score. "The Concession" ended with the two golfers walking off the course with arms around each other's shoulders. Jacklin and Nicklaus later co-designed a golf course in Florida called "The Concession" to commemorate the moment.

Jacklin suffered a devastating near-miss in The Open Championship of 1972 at Muirfield. Tied for the lead with playing partner Lee Trevino playing the 71st hole, Jacklin had a straightforward 15-foot birdie putt on the par-5 hole, while Trevino was not yet on the green after four struggling strokes. But Trevino holed a difficult chip shot, and Jacklin took three putts, leaving him one shot behind. Trevino parred the final hole to win, but Jacklin bogeyed, finishing third behind Jack Nicklaus. Jacklin was just 28 years old at the time, but never seriously contended again in a major championship. In 2013, Jacklin said of his experience in the 1972 Open: "I was never the same again after that. I didn't ever get my head around it – it definitely knocked the stuffing out of me somehow."

In 1973 Jacklin won the Caribbean Tour's Los Lagartos Open at 261 (–27). He defeated runner-up Gene Borek by 13 shots. It was the third lowest score ever by a professional at a four-round tournament outside of the United States.

Jacklin served as the non-playing captain of Europe in four consecutive Ryder Cups from 1983 to 1989. He had a 2.5–1.5 won-loss record, captaining his men to their first victory in 28 years in 1985, and to their first ever victory in the United States in 1987.

Jacklin was inducted into the World Golf Hall of Fame in 2002. He retired from tournament golf in 2004 at the age of sixty, having won a number of events at senior level. Jacklin has developed a golf course design business since his retirement from competition. He has designed numerous courses, including the 9-hole par 3 course of The St. Pierre Park Hotel in Guernsey.

Personal life
Jacklin's first wife, Vivien, was from Belfast, Northern Ireland. The couple married in 1966, eleven months after their initial meeting at a Belfast hotel. They had three children together: Bradley, Warren and Tina. Vivien Jacklin died suddenly of a brain haemorrhage in April 1988, aged 44. In an interview in 2002, Jacklin said: "You can't understand the anguish of losing a spouse until it happens to you. I lost my will to live after my first wife died. I contemplated doing something very terrible to myself. Eventually I recovered."

Six weeks after his first wife's death, Jacklin met a 16-year-old waitress named Donna Methven at a golf tournament in England. Jacklin later said: "I was at my lowest ebb and Donna was a shoulder to cry on." They had a two-month affair which led to front-page headlines in British tabloid newspapers. In December 1988, Jacklin married his second wife, Astrid Waagen, a Norwegian woman. They have a son called Sean, who is a professional golfer. Jacklin is also stepfather to Waagen's two children, daughter Anna May and son A.J., from her previous marriage to former Bee Gees guitarist Alan Kendall.

In 1971, Jacklin said that he received death threats from a caller who also threatened to bomb his wife's family home in Belfast. The caller said that Jacklin would be shot if he played in the Ulster Open, because his wife's family supported Ian Paisley. Jacklin withdrew from the tournament.

Jacklin said in an interview in 1989 that he was barely on speaking terms with his mother. "To get along with people I have to like them. My mother and I don't get along. I don't share the belief that blood is thicker than water. She has tried to run my life long enough," Jacklin said.

Jacklin has been hearing impaired since the 1980s and wears a hearing aid device on both sides. He is a patron of the English Deaf Golf Association.

Jacklin was second in the BBC Sports Personality of the Year Award in both 1969 and 1970. He was a subject of the television programme This Is Your Life in February 1970 when he was surprised by Eamonn Andrews outside Buckingham Palace after receiving his OBE which he had received in the 1970 New Year Honours. He later received a CBE in the 1990 New Year Honours. In 2013, Jacklin took part in the eleventh series of the BBC1 Saturday night entertainment competition, Strictly Come Dancing. He was the first celebrity to be eliminated from the show.

Professional wins (29)

PGA Tour wins (4)

PGA Tour playoff record (1–1)

European Tour wins (8)

European Tour playoff record (1–1)

Other European wins (9)

Australia and New Zealand wins (3)

South American Golf Circuit wins (1)

Caribbean Tour wins (2)

South African wins (1)

Senior PGA Tour wins (2)

Major championships

Wins (2)

Results timeline

CUT = missed the halfway cut
"T" indicates a tie for a place.

Summary

 Most consecutive cuts made – 7 (1963 Open Championship – 1968 Open Championship)
 Longest streak of top-10s – 2 (1970 US Open – 1970 Open Championship)

Team appearances
 Ryder Cup (representing Great Britain & Ireland/Europe): 1967, 1969, 1971, 1973, 1975, 1977, 1979, 1983 (non-playing captain), 1985 (winners, non-playing captain), 1987 (winners, non-playing captain), 1989 (tied, retained Cup, non-playing captain)
 World Cup (representing England): 1966, 1970, 1971, 1972
 Double Diamond International (representing England): 1972 (winners), 1973, 1974, 1976 (winners, captain), 1977 (captain)
 Marlboro Nations' Cup (representing England): 1972, 1973
 Hennessy Cognac Cup (representing Great Britain and Ireland): 1976 (winners, captain), 1982 (winners, captain)
 UBS Cup (representing the Rest of the World): 2003 (tie, captain)

See also
1967 PGA Tour Qualifying School graduates
List of golfers with most European Tour wins

References

External links

 
 
 
 Tony Jacklin Golf Course Design site

English male golfers
European Tour golfers
PGA Tour golfers
European Senior Tour golfers
PGA Tour Champions golfers
Ryder Cup competitors for Europe
Winners of men's major golf championships
World Golf Hall of Fame inductees
Golf course architects
Commanders of the Order of the British Empire
Sportspeople from Scunthorpe
1944 births
Living people